The 1989 NHK Trophy was held at the Port Island Sports Center in Kobe on November 23–26. Medals were awarded in the disciplines of men's singles, ladies' singles, pair skating, and ice dancing.

Results

Men

Ladies

Pairs

Ice dancing

External links
 1989 NHK Trophy

Nhk Trophy, 1989
NHK Trophy